Elizabeth Brake is an American philosopher and Professor of Philosophy at Rice University. She is known for her works on ethics and political philosophy.
Brake coined the term amatonormativity to describe the widespread, but false, belief that everyone is better off in an exclusive, romantic, long-term coupled relationship, and that everyone is seeking such a relationship.
Her book Minimizing Marriage received Honorable Mention for the American Philosophical Association Book Prize in 2014. Brake is the editor-in-chief of the Journal of Applied Philosophy.

Books
 Minimizing Marriage: Marriage, Morality, and the Law, Oxford University Press, 2012.
 Philosophical Foundations of Children’s and Family Law, edited with Lucinda Ferguson, Oxford University Press, 2018. 
 After Marriage: Rethinking Marital Relationships (ed.), Oxford University Press, 2016.

References

External links
 Brake's personal website

Living people
21st-century American philosophers
American philosophy academics
Philosophy writers
Rice University faculty
Philosophers of sexuality
American women philosophers
Arizona State University faculty
Academic staff of the University of Calgary
Auburn University faculty
American political philosophers
Feminist philosophers
Philosophers of love
Kant scholars
Hegel scholars
Year of birth missing (living people)